Megalancistrus parananus is a species of armored catfish native to Argentina, Brazil, Paraguay and Uruguay where it is found in the Paraguay, Paraná, and Uruguay River basins.  This species grows to a length of  SL.

References 
 

Ancistrini
Fish of South America
Fish of Brazil
Fish of Argentina
Fish of Paraguay
Fish of Uruguay
Fish described in 1881
Taxa named by Wilhelm Peters